Robert Anthony Rice (born 23 February 1989) is an English footballer who plays as a right back for Basingstoke Town.

Rice joined Wycombe as a trainee after being released by Fulham. He made his first appearance for Wycombe in a 1–0 defeat to Notts County at the end of the 2007–08 season before being released on 6 May 2009. He joined Basingstoke Town on 19 June on a one-year contract. He is now Basingstoke Town's a first choice right defender.

References

External links

1989 births
Living people
English footballers
Association football fullbacks
Fulham F.C. players
Wycombe Wanderers F.C. players
Basingstoke Town F.C. players
English Football League players